António José de Castro Bagão Félix (born 9 April 1948) is a Portuguese economist and politician.

Education 
Bagão Félix received his university degree in Finance from the Technical University of Lisbon's ISEG, formerly known as ISCEF (1970), and a diploma in management by INSEAD (Fontainebleau, 1995).

Political life 
Bagão Félix received administrative powers more than once. He took part in many governments formed in Portugal in his career.

Bagão Félix was the Deputy in the Assembleia da República, elected by the Association of London (1983–1985); he was the Deputy to the Parliamentary Assembly of the Council of Europe; and he was a member of its Committee on Social Affairs and Health in the same years. He has been active also in the anti-abortion movement.

Publications
Félix is the author of several books and has joined the editorial boards of journals such as Citizenship, New Labor, Company, Hyphen Magazine, and Public Health. He is a columnist in several newspapers such as Público, Jornal de Negócios, Correio do Vouga, Voz da Verdade, Revista Cais and Boletim Salesiano, among others, and he participates in the radio program Board on Antena1.

Career highlights 
 (1973–1976) financial director of Companhia de Seguros Mundial
 (1976–1979) member of the Management Board of Insurance Credit
 (1979–1980) member of the Council Board of the National Insurance Institute
 (1985–1987) director of the Bank of Commerce and Industry
 (1992–1993) director of the Bank of Portugal
 (1993–1994) Vice-Governor
 (1994–2002) Director-General of the Portuguese Commercial Bank

Additionally he served in various public institutions and social organizations.
 (1997–2002) Chairman of the supervisory board of the Bank Against Hunger
 (since 2001) Consultant to the Portuguese Episcopal Conference for Social Affairs and Ethical and board member of the SEATS (Association for Economic and Social Development).

Teaching in higher education:
 (1972–1973) teaching assistant in the Institute of Economic and Financial Sciences
 (1975–1976) teaching assistant Institute of Labor and Company
 (1986–1994) Assistant Professor in the International University (Lisbon)
 (since 1991) a member of the General Council of the University of Aveiro

Government posts 
 XV Constitutional Government
 Minister of Social Security and Labor
 XVI Constitutional Government
 Minister of Finance

Personal life 
Bagão Félix is a known member and supporter of S.L. Benfica.

References

External links 
 Biography at Portugal.gov.pt (Portuguese)

1948 births
Living people
People from Ílhavo
Portuguese anti-abortion activists
20th-century Portuguese economists
Portuguese Roman Catholics
Members of the Assembly of the Republic (Portugal)
Government ministers of Portugal
Finance ministers of Portugal
Labour ministers of Portugal
CDS – People's Party politicians
Technical University of Lisbon alumni
21st-century Portuguese economists